Hyperpolarized 129Xe gas magnetic resonance imaging (MRI) is a medical imaging technique used to visualize the anatomy and physiology of body regions that are difficult to image with standard proton MRI. In particular, the lung, which lacks substantial density of protons, is particularly useful to be visualized with 129Xe gas MRI. This technique has promise as an early-detection technology for chronic lung diseases and imaging technique for processes and structures reliant on dissolved gases. 129Xe is a stable, naturally occurring isotope of xenon with 26.44% isotope abundance. It is one of two Xe isotopes, along with 131Xe, that has non-zero spin, which allows for magnetic resonance. 129Xe is used for MRI because its large electron cloud permits hyperpolarization and a wide range of chemical shifts. The hyperpolarization creates a large signal intensity, and the wide range of chemical shifts allows for identifying when the 129Xe associates with molecules like hemoglobin. 129Xe is preferred over 131Xe for MRI because 129Xe has spin 1/2 (compared to 3/2 for 131Xe), a longer T1, and 3.4 times larger gyromagnetic ratio (11.78 MHz/T).

Uses

Medical uses 

Xenon Xe 129 hyperpolarized, sold under the brand name Xenoview, is a hyperpolarized contrast agent indicated for use with magnetic resonance imaging (MRI) for evaluation of lung ventilation, and approved for people aged 12 years of age and older.

The US Food and Drug Administration (FDA) considers it to be a first-in-class medication.

History 
Hyperpolarized 129Xe is achieved through spin-exchange optical pumping, a technique developed by Grover et al. in 1978 and improved by Happer et al. in 1984. Quantification of 129Xe polarization was first described in 1982 by Bhaskar et al.. The use of hyperpolarized 129Xe gas in MRI ex-vivo was first described by Albert et al. in 1994 using excised rat lungs. The first in-vivo human studies with 129Xe MRI were published by Mugler et al. in 1997.

129Xe MRI has largely begun to replace 3He gas MRI, a very similar technology that uses hyperpolarized 3He molecules instead of 129Xe. Grossman et al. began human clinical trials for 3He MRI in 1996. 3He was originally touted as the better gas for hyperpolarized gas MRI because it is more polarizable and has no effects on the body. However, 3He is mostly produced by the beta decay of tritium (3H), which is a product of nuclear warhead production. Additionally, 3He is widely used by the U.S. military to detect smuggled plutonium. These combination of increasing scarcity and increasing demand have combined to make 3He highly expensive, up to more than $1000 per liter.

Safety 
129Xe is an inert, non-radioactive, non-toxic, and non-teratogenic molecule that has shown no significant adverse health effects when inhaled for MR imaging. One potential area of concern is 129Xe’s anesthetic properties when a large volume is inhaled. Xenon shows blood and tissue solubility that allows it to diffuse through the lung membrane and affect the nervous system. The minimum alveolar concentration for 50% of motor response to be prevented (MAC) is 0.71, which is not reached during imaging. Further studies have shown that it provides good circulatory stability when dissolved in blood and does not affect body temperature.

Hyperpolarization 
When applying an external magnetic field to gas, half of the nuclear spins of the gas atoms point towards the direction of the magnetic field whereas the other half point in the opposite direction. It is slightly more energetically favorable to be aligned with the magnetic field, meaning that one of the spin states is in slight excess of the other. This excess means that the two spin-states do not completely cancel each other out, creating a magnetic signal which can be observed with MRI. However, for traditional 1H MRI, only about 4 ppm of the spin states do not cancel, so the signal is not particularly strong. This means that only regions with high densities of protons, like muscle tissue can be seen. Hyperpolarization is a means of flipping more of the atoms to have the same spin state so that less of the spin states cancel each other. In the case of 129Xe, this leads to a 104-105 improvement in signal strength. 

Hyperpolarization of 129Xe is usually performed using spin-exchange optical pumping (SEOP) using circularly polarized light to add angular momentum of the atoms. However, the polarized light cannot directly transfer angular momentum to the gas nuclei, thus, an alkali metal atom is used as an intermediary. Rubidium is often used to accomplish this, where the polarized light is tuned to provide exactly the necessary energy to excite rubidium’s valence electron. This process is called optical pumping. In the next step, spin exchange, gas nuclei are introduced to the system and collide with the rubidium. They receive angular momentum in the collisions with rubidium valence electrons, which, by conservation of angular momentum, is in the same direction as the rubidium. Therefore, 129Xe becomes hyperpolarized because there is a large excess of one spin state compared to the other. After this, the 129Xe is extracted, the rubidium is polarized again, and the cycle continues.

Required modifications to conventional MRI 
Traditional MR scanners need to be modified to detect 129Xe, as 129Xe has a lower gyromagnetic ratio of 11.77 MHz/T compared to that of protons, 42.5 MHz/T. Thus, the Larmor frequency of 129Xe is much lower, which is difficult to detect with conventional narrow-band RF amplifiers set to proton’s Larmor frequency. Therefore, a broad-band RF amplifier, for both excitation and receiving, is required. Additionally, the pulse sequence must also accommodate the difference in thermally-polarized protons and polarized 129Xe. In proton MRI, a typical pulse sequence would involve a 90° flip then a subsequent T1 longitudinal relaxation to the external magnetic field. T1 relaxation in hyperpolarized gas involves the decay of magnetization and not the return to an external magnetic field, as in thermally-polarized protons. Therefore, after a 90° flip, a hyperpolarized gas nuclei’s longitudinal relaxation is negligible, making the longitudinal magnetization remain zero after the flip. As a result, traditional 90° and 180° RF pulses are not desirable. A low-angle RF pulse is therefore used to only remove a portion of the total available magnetization of the hyperpolarized 129Xe gas. This produces comparable longitudinal magnetization between protons and 129Xe gas. Furthermore, as an image needs to be acquired within a breath-hold, a fast pulse-sequences, or fast-gradient echos, are used to adequately sample the k-space.

Notably, there is a large amount of motion when the lungs expand and contract. This motion prevents getting a high-quality image. To alleviate this problem, the full scan must be accomplished within a 10-15 second breath hold, so 129Xe gas MRI scans are sometimes of lower resolution than the clinical standard. Additionally, another constraint is that flipping the protons with the B1 gradient occurs at about a quarter of the speed of proton MRI. This occurs due to the difference between the Larmor frequencies. Ultimately, the time constraints of these images requires different and novel MRI sequence designs.

Applications

Ventilation MRI 
After a patient inhales the hyperpolarized gas, the gas passes through the airways within the lungs. In a healthy lung, the gas is able to travel throughout the lungs. However, in a disease that obstructs airways, such as chronic obstructive pulmonary disease (COPD), asthma, and cystic fibrosis, the hyperpolarized gas is unable to reach certain regions within the lung. Thus, a spin-density weighted image will produce high signals from normal areas and low signals from diseased regions. 3He was originally used for this type of image, but recently there has been a shift towards to 129Xe due to its availability and cheaper price. Hyperpolarized 3He has historically produced superior images because it is easier to hyperpolarize, but current technology has improved gas polarization of 129Xe to the point where the image quality is similar. Furthermore, 129Xe is more sensitive to obstructions as it is a larger atom than 3He. In addition, an increased inhaled volume of 129Xe results in a comparable SNR to that of 3He, up to 1 vs 0.1-0.3 liters.

Diffusion MRI 
Diffusion MRI involves calculating the apparent diffusion coefficient (ADC) of the hyperpolarized gas. Diffusion-sensitizing gradients are applied to induce diffusion based attenuation to calculate the ADC. These gradients have an associated b-value, which represents the strength and duration of the gradients. At least 2 different b-value gradients are used to calculate the ADC. The ADC provides information regarding how the structure of the lung restricts the hyperpolarized gas diffusion. The value of the ADC increases in regions of increased space. For example, in healthy lungs, the ADC using 129Xe might be around 0.04 cm2/s whereas the ADC for 129Xe in an open space may be around 0.14 cm2/s. In emphysema, where alveolar structures enlarge, the gas is able to diffuse more freely, resulting in a higher ADC compared to normal regions providing information of disease areas. Ultimately, this is a novel imaging modality enabled by 129Xe MRI, and its use is being investigated for Chronic Obstructive Pulmonary Disease, Asthma, Cystic Fibrosis, Long-COVID-19, and other diseases.

Partial pressure of oxygen 
The longitudinal relaxation (T1) of the hyperpolarized gas is inversely proportional to the concentration of the oxygen in the lung. The interaction between paramagnetic oxygen significantly decreases the relaxation time, which offers insights into the partial pressure of oxygen (pO2) within regions of the lung. Additionally, the ventilation to perfusion ratio can be calculated from these images. Most research has employed 3He, but improved technology has allowed for comparable results when using 129Xe. However, due to the uptake of 129Xe, its relaxation is much quicker than 3He resulting in higher apparent pO2 if left unaccounted.

Research 

129Xe gas MRI is being researched as a diagnostic test for respiratory diseases, such as COPD, asthma, and emphysema. Currently, spirometry pulmonary function tests are used to determine the condition of lung function. However, this is a fairly basic, global assessment of lung function that does not provide specific information about the lung structure and physiology. For structural information, X-Ray CT is most commonly used, but it exposes the patient to high doses of ionizing radiation and it provides no functional information Conventional 1H MRI is not effective in the lung airspace because of the minimal proton density. 129Xe gas MRI provides detailed, specific information about lung structure and function that are not safely or efficiently obtainable by existing technologies.

FDA approval 
129Xe Gas MRI has completed Phase I, II, and III clinical trials, led by Polarean, Inc. Xenon has anesthetic properties when delivered in a high dose; therefore, it is being investigated not as a device, but as a drug. This distinction has greatly slowed the adoption of 129Xe gas MRI in the clinic, but is important to guaranteeing safety. In October of 2020, Polarean submitted for approval, but the FDA rejected their NDA. Polarean has since resubmitted their application, with the next round of feedback slated for early 2021. Ultimately, much of the future utility of 129Xe Gas MRI will depend on its receiving FDA approval.

Visualizing non-lung tissues 
129Xe gas is most commonly used to visualize the lung because it is a gas. However, small bubbles of xenon gas are capable of dissolving into the bloodstream at the alveoli. As these bubbles travel around the body, they can be used to gain insight into other regions of the body. 129Xe gas is capable of crossing the blood brain barrier, allowing novel study of brain perfusion.r

Improving amount of hyperpolarization 
Using hyperpolarized gas to image the lungs is not particularly novel, as the use of 3He was established in the early 2000s. 3He was originally chosen because it was easily hyperpolarized to a very large degree, and therefore generated a very strong signal. Recently, improvements in hyperpolarization techniques have been able to generate more hyperpolarized 129Xe, enabling it to generate comparable images to 3He.

References 

Magnetic resonance imaging
MRI contrast agents